The 1984 Detroit Grand Prix was a Formula One motor race held on June 24, 1984 in Detroit, Michigan. It was the eighth race of the 1984 Formula One World Championship.

The 63-lap race was won from pole position by Brazilian driver Nelson Piquet, driving a Brabham-BMW. Englishman Martin Brundle finished second in a Tyrrell-Ford, less than a second behind Piquet, before the Tyrrell team were disqualified from the championship for various alleged rule infringements. Italian Elio de Angelis was thus promoted to second in his Lotus-Renault with another Italian, Teo Fabi, third in the other Brabham-BMW.

Pre-race
After breaking his leg at the Monaco Grand Prix three weeks before, and subsequently withdrawing from the next race in Canada, Patrick Tambay was back driving for the works Renault team. Mario Andretti, who had been called in as a possible replacement for Tambay in the race, was satisfied to spend the weekend as a spectator, watching his two sons run in the support races. Elsewhere, a lack of Hart turbo engines meant that the Spirit team were forced to modify their car to accommodate a naturally-aspirated Ford Cosworth DFV for this race.

Qualifying report
Qualifying saw Nelson Piquet take pole position in his Brabham-BMW, his second in succession and fourth of the season, by over 0.6 seconds from Alain Prost in the McLaren-TAG. Nigel Mansell, having set the fastest time in the Friday session in his Lotus-Renault, was third, a further 0.5 seconds behind, with Michele Alboreto fourth in the Ferrari. On the third row of the grid were Mansell's teammate Elio de Angelis and Derek Warwick in the factory Renault, and on the fourth row were Ayrton Senna in the Toleman and Eddie Cheever in the Alfa Romeo. Patrick Tambay in the second Renault and Niki Lauda in the second McLaren completed the top ten. Piquet's teammate Teo Fabi could only manage 23rd, while Huub Rothengatter came 27th and last in the Spirit-Ford and thus failed to qualify.

Qualifying classification

Race report
Warm and sunny weather returned on Sunday after an overnight storm had washed the track clean, but at the green light, there was immediate chaos. Nigel Mansell had decided that he could get by Nelson Piquet off the grid and aimed his Lotus for the space between Piquet's Brabham and Alain Prost's McLaren. He struck the back of Prost and bounced into the side of Piquet, sending the Brabham sliding to the outside wall of the track and into Michele Alboreto's Ferrari. The Brabham's right rear wheel was launched into the air and landed on the front of Ayrton Senna's Toleman, breaking the suspension. At the same time, Marc Surer suddenly found his charge from the back of the grid blocked by Piquet's stricken car, and drove his Arrows into the Brabham's left front wheel. Taking no chances, the organizers stopped the race and made preparations for a restart.

Piquet, Alboreto and Senna took to their spare cars, but the Arrows team had none to offer Surer, so the Swiss driver was absent when the field reassembled on the grid. The second start came off without a hitch, as Piquet led from Prost and Mansell. At the end of the first lap, these three were followed by Alboreto, Eddie Cheever who had already gained three places, Derek Warwick, Elio de Angelis, Niki Lauda, Patrick Tambay and Ayrton Senna. Prost followed closely behind Piquet for the first few laps, then dropped back when his rear tires began to lose grip. As a result, Mansell closed up on the Frenchman and overtook him on lap 10, with Piquet five seconds ahead.

Immediately, Mansell fought hard to catch the leading Brabham, taking over a second per lap off his lead. Piquet, it seemed, was driving just fast enough to stay in front, however, and Mansell was unable to get within striking distance. On lap 17, the Lotus slowed noticeably while entering the Atwater Tunnel, as he had lost second gear. Meanwhile, not only Prost, but the Renaults of Warwick and Tambay, and then Lauda were forced to stop for new tires, while Piquet was having no trouble at all with the abrasive surface. Within moments of each other on lap 22, Senna's right rear wheel came off in 5th gear on the main straight and he spun into the tire barrier in Turn one while under pressure from Keke Rosberg, and Cheever retired from third place with a cracked inter-cooler. Mansell finally gave up the struggle with his disintegrating gearbox on lap 28, handing second place to Alboreto, 15 seconds behind Piquet. Elio de Angelis was a close third in the second Lotus, then a long gap back to Rosberg and the stunning Tyrrell rookies, Martin Brundle and Stefan Bellof.

The Tyrrell team, still loyal to the normally aspirated Cosworth-Ford V8 engine, were given no chance on the season of being competitive against the mighty turbos. Already, however, they had been in the points four times in seven races, and on a tight circuit, their lighter weight and lower horsepower combined to give much better tire wear. In Detroit, this allowed them to use the softer Goodyear compound, while all the others had to use the harder compound. Also, the compactness of the cars, in comparison with the turbos, was an advantage in threading between the concrete walls, especially through the chicane leading on to the pit straight. Most importantly, Brundle and Bellof were putting in much better performances in their first year than anyone could have expected. Here, with things threatening to deteriorate at half distance, it was Brundle who would bring the race back to life.

Bellof, however, suddenly ground to a halt on lap 34 when he struck the wall exiting the chicane before the pits. Then, just as Brundle was pitting for water ballast, Warwick set the fastest lap of the race and passed Rosberg and de Angelis on consecutive laps to take third place. About to set off after Alboreto, Warwick's Renault suddenly lost fifth gear, allowing de Angelis and Rosberg to repass him on lap 37. His gearbox completely expired on lap 41, and he became the eighteenth retirement of the day, leaving only eight cars still running. Rosberg succumbed next with a broken turbocharger, and when Alboreto blew his engine on lap 50, Piquet led by more than 30 seconds.

Brundle now found himself in third place and gaining on de Angelis, who was driving without second gear in his Lotus as teammate Mansell had done before retiring. By lap 56, Brundle had erased the ten seconds between him and the Lotus, and he passed by as they approached the chicane to take second place. With seven laps to go, Piquet was 20 seconds ahead and winding down his boost as he allowed Prost to unlap himself. Brundle continued to charge, however, taking almost five seconds per lap off the Champion's lead. Even as Brundle pulled within a second on their last entrance to the Tunnel, Piquet remained cool and took his second victory in eight days by just a few car lengths. The only remaining finishers were de Angelis, thirty seconds back; the second Brabham of Teo Fabi (scoring his first points); Prost and the Williams of Jacques Laffite.

Soon after the podium ceremony, word arrived that the officials had found impurities in the water injection system on Brundle's Tyrrell and lead balls in the rubber bag containing the water. Samples of the water were shipped to France and Texas for analysis and were found to contain significant levels of hydrocarbons, though this finding was later overturned on retesting. Ken Tyrrell was called to a meeting of the FISA Executive Committee on July 18 and, based on the impurities in the water, which had been topped up during a pit stop, was accused of refueling the car during the race. (Refueling had been banned prior to the 1984 season and remained illegal until 1994.) The team was banned from the remainder of the World Championship and lost the 13 points they had already gained, though they continued to race, unable to score points. That was weeks later, however, and the organizers in Detroit were grateful for the stirring drive by the English rookie that was the highlight of their event. With his disqualification, however, only 5 drivers were given points, so it wasn't a sixth classified as Alboreto, the last retiree, didn't complete the 90% of the race distance.

Race classification

Championship standings after the race

Drivers' Championship standings

Constructors' Championship standings

References

Further reading
 Innes Ireland (October 1984). "3rd Detroit Grand Prix: Look Out, Alain!". Road & Track, 150-154.
 Mike S. Lang (1992). Grand Prix!: Race-by-race account of Formula 1 World Championship motor racing. Volume 4: 1981 to 1984. Haynes Publishing Group. 

Detroit Grand Prix
Detroit Grand Prix
Detroit Grand Prix
Detroit Grand Prix
Detroit Grand Prix